George Washington Harkins (1810 – October 23, 1861) was an attorney and prominent chief of the Choctaw tribe during Indian removal.

Elected as principal chief after the national council deposed his maternal uncle, Greenwood LeFlore, Harkins was elected judge of the Red River District in Indian Territory in 1834. In 1850, he was chosen as chief of the Apukshunnubbee District (one of three) of the Choctaw Nation and served until 1857.

Early life and education
Harkins was born into a high-status Choctaw clan through his mother, Louisa "Lusony" LeFlore. His father was Willis J Harkins. His oldest maternal uncle, traditionally the most important mentor to a boy child, was Greenwood LeFlore, the chief of the Choctaw. Harkins learned from both his cultures but identified as Choctaw first and foremost.

Harkins was educated at Centre College in Danville, Kentucky. He earned a law degree from Cumberland University.

Marriage and family
Harkins married Salina Gardner and Lily Folsom, Daughter of Chief David Folsom and Rhoda Nail. It is said that he also married Laris Narcissy Leflore and had two children, but no evidence of that has been found.

He had several children with them who survived to adulthood: Richard, Sarah, Catherine, Ellen, David Folsom "Dave" Harkins (1828 - 1879), Susan (b. 1830- ), Cornelia, Henry Clay Harkins (1833-1886), Loren (b. 1835- ), and Mary Jane Harkins (b. 1837- ). All belonged to their mother's clans and gained status in the tribe through them.

His brother Willis had a son, George Willis Harkins (1835-1890), who was known as "The Rawhide Orator". See Leaders and Leading Men of the Indian Territory (Chicago : American Publishers' Association, 1891), page 254.

Career
In October 1830, the national council deposed Greenwood LeFlore as chief after he signed the treaty for removal. It elected Harkins, who belonged to the same clan and was a nephew of LeFlore through his mother. In the Choctaw matrilineal system, the mother's clan was the one that was most important to a person's status. To proceed with Indian Removal, President Andrew Jackson refused to recognize Harkins's authority with the tribe.

After Indian Removal, Harkins rose in influence in the tribe. In 1834, he was elected judge of the Red River District in Indian Territory. The council of chiefs of the Indian District elected him as principal chief of the District (one of three in the Choctaw Nation), where he served from 1850 to 1857.

The districts represented the longstanding geographic and political divisions that had existed in the tribe in the Southeast. Gradually, in Indian Territory, they became less important.

Influence
Harkins' 1831 "Farewell Letter to the American People," denouncing the removal of the Choctaw, was widely published in American newspapers. It is still widely regarded as one of the most important documents of Native American history.

Harkins wrote in part:

See also
Apuckshunubbee
Pushmataha
Mosholatubbee
Greenwood LeFlore
Peter Pitchlynn
Phillip Martin
List of Choctaw Treaties

References

External links
 "Transcript of 'Farewell to the American People'" from ushistory.org

1810 births
1861 deaths
Chiefs of the Choctaw
Choctaw Nation of Oklahoma politicians
Centre College alumni
Cumberland School of Law alumni
Native American leaders
Native American Christians
19th-century Native Americans